Gerry Kissell (born May 19, 1964) is an American comic book artist who has made contributions to IDW Publishing, and their graphic novels Code Word: Geronimo, The A-Team, and Iron Sky. As a former U.S. Army combat medic, he focused most of his career on doing military-themed projects, including book covers for authors Dale Dye and John M Del Vecchio, and designing the logos for Dale Dye's companies, Warriors Inc., and Warrior Publishing Group.

On October 5, 2011, Blind Spot Pictures released a digital comic prequel to the Iron Sky film, titled Iron Sky: Bad Moon Rising, written by the writer of Alan Wake, Mikko Rautalahti, and fully illustrated by comic artist Gerry Kissell. IDW Publishing printed these comics in a softcover graphic novel collection in March 2013.

In December 2013, Xbox released a special collector's edition of its hit horror game Alan Wake, featuring new content on the disc, including a 44-page digital comic book with art by Gerry Kissell and Amin Amat, and written by Remedy Entertainment's Mikko Rautalahti, who also wrote the script for the video game.

Kissell and a team of creative military veterans, as well as television and film actor Kurt Yaeger (Greg the Peg on Sons of Anarchy), in 2012, began developing Vindicated Inc., a military-themed graphic novel series referring to itself as the 'First-Ever Disabled Veteran Action Hero Comic'. Yaeger serves as the model for the lead character in the book because he himself has a prosthetic leg. Other film and television actors appear in the book as well, including Dale Dye, Erik Audé, Aaron Douglas (actor), Chance Kelly as well as author Shane Moore, creator of the horror book series, The Apocalypse of Enoch, who also served as a writer on part of the Vindicated Inc. graphic novel. Kissell explains that the book series deals with the perception of disabilities as well as PTSD.

On the 950th anniversary of the Battle of Hastings, October 14, 2016, a commemorative 124 page Graphic Novel, titled Bayeux, published by Tapestry Comics, written by history teacher Tyler Button, and illustrated by comic book artist and creator Gerry Kissell with inker Amin Amat, was released, telling the story of the Battle of Hastings, as well as the incidents leading up to the battle, including the Battle of Stamford Bridge, where the last Viking King, Harald Hardrada was killed by King Harold Godwinson's forces.

References

External links 
 Combat Veterans With PTSD 
 Comic Book and Movie Reviews 
 Diamond Comics 
  CNN 
 New York Times
 Washington Times 
 Comic Book Resource
 News-a-Rama
 Comic Book Database 

American cartoonists
American comics artists
People from Missouri
Living people
1964 births